Jack Lemvard (born 14 September 1984) is a Thai racing driver currently competing in the TCR International Series and TCR Thailand Touring Car Championship. Having previously competed in the Thailand Super Series, Asian Touring Car Series and Formula BMW Asia amongst others.

Racing career
Lemvard began his career in 1998 in Karting, he raced there until 2006, winning two titles in 1998 and 2006. He switched to the Thai Toyota Vios Cup in 2006 and won the title that year. In 2007 he switched to the Thai Honda Pro Cup, winning the championship five times in a row from 2007-11. He also raced in the Benelux Formula Ford Championship and Formula BMW Asia in 2007. For 2008 he switched to the Asian Touring Car Series, taking seven wins on his way to winning the championship. He also raced in the ADAC Procar Series and Thailand Super Series, taking multiple wins in both series', finishing fourth and third in the two championship standings respectively. He continued in the Thailand Super Series for 2009, winning the championship three times from 2009-11. In 2012 he switched to the Thai Lotus Cup, winning the title that year, returning to the Thailand Super Series in 2014, after a one-year hiatus. He stayed there til 2015, finishing third in the GTM class. He also raced in the Thai Honda Jazz Super Cup that year, winning the title that year. For 2016 he switched to the all new 2016 TCR Thailand Touring Car Championship, where he also took part in the 2016 TCR Asia Series round held in Thailand.

In August 2016 it was announced that he would race in the TCR International Series, driving a SEAT León Cup Racer for Vattana Motorsport.

Racing record

Complete TCR International Series results
(key) (Races in bold indicate pole position) (Races in italics indicate fastest lap)

References

External links
 
 

1984 births
Living people
TCR Asia Series drivers
TCR International Series drivers
Jack Lemvard
Asian Touring Car Championship drivers
Formula BMW Asia drivers
Engstler Motorsport drivers